Steffani Jemison (born 1981) is an American artist based in Brooklyn, New York. Her work has been shown at Museum of Modern Art, Brooklyn Museum, and other US and international venues.

Personal life 
Jemison was born in Berkeley, California and grew up in Cincinnati, Ohio. She holds an MFA from the School of the Art Institute of Chicago (2009) and a BA in Comparative Literature from Columbia University (2003).  She was a Tiffany Foundation Biennial Awardee (2013) and Art Matters Awardee (2014). She is an Assistant Professor in Media in the Department of Art and Design at the Mason Gross School of the Arts at Rutgers University.  She previously taught at Parsons The New School for Design and the Art Institute of Chicago.

As a child, she attended summer camp at the Carnegie Museum of Art. Her favorite class was one in which she was asked to write a story about one of the works in the collection.

Works 
Major works include Prime (2016), Promise Machine (2015), Projections (2014), Stroke (2013) You Completes Me (2013), Personal (2014), Escaped Lunatic (2010–11), Maniac Chase (2008-9), and Same Time. Jemison's 2014 video Personal was included in the 2014 show "Crossing Brooklyn: Art from Bushwick, Bed-Stuy, and Beyond" at the Brooklyn Museum.

Promise Machine combined a reading group with performance. Participants formed a "Utopia Club," based on the Utopia Neighborhood Club, and including artists, activists, writers, and book club members. Jemison created a musical performance incorporating text generated in the reading group. She was partially inspired by the shared reading experiences that a church creates. Promise Machine attempts to create a similar experience in a secular space. Prime references texts from key historical and cultural moments to explore the relationship between privacy and revolution.

You Completes Me is a performance installation that a live reading of excerpts from urban fiction while the 1927 film The Scar of Shame plays, putting historical moments in conversation with contemporary ones.

Jemison's films Manic Chase and Escaped Lunatic are both inspired by early twentieth-century films. They focus on the actors' movements; she is particularly interested in the political implications of movement.

Along with Heather Hart and Jina Valentine, she curated "The Intuitionists," a viewing program in which artists illustrated concepts from a paragraph in Colson Whitehead's novel, The Intuitionist. This installation was part of a viewing program at the Drawing Center.

As an agent in the Hillman Photography Initiative at the Carnegie Museum of Art, Jemison collaborated with Liz Deschenes, Laura Wexler, and Dan Leers to create a platform demonstrating the relationship between photography and Pittsburgh. Their work emphasized the physical conditions that make photography possible.

Jemison was awarded the Radcliffe Fellowship at Harvard University in 2017. She debuted her solo exhibition at Kai Matsumiya gallery in New York City in 2019, and in 2020, she was awarded a Creative Capital grant along with forty other artists. 

Jemison received a Guggenheim Fellowship in 2020.

Future Plan and Program 
Jemison's 2010-11 project Future Plan and Program commissions and publishes literary works by artists of color. It continued her artistic interest in reading while aiming to make books available to a wide community. It has published works by Martine Syms, Jibade-Khalil Huffman, Harold Mendez, and Jina Valentine, among others.

References

External links 

 
 Promise Machine exhibition at MoMA
Ben Lerner on Jemison at The New York Review of Books

Living people
21st-century American artists
School of the Art Institute of Chicago alumni
African-American contemporary artists
American contemporary artists
21st-century American women artists
1981 births
Columbia College (New York) alumni
21st-century African-American women
21st-century African-American artists
20th-century African-American people
20th-century African-American women